Alexandru Lipcan is a Moldovan politician.

Biography 

He served as member of the Parliament of Moldova (2005–2009).

External links 
 Parlamentul Republicii Moldova
 List of the BMD candidates for parliamentary elections 2005
 List of Members of the Parliament of the Republic of Moldova elected on March 6, 2005
 Lista deputaţilor aleşi la 6 martie 2005 în Parlamentul Republicii Moldova

References

1959 births
Living people
Moldovan MPs 2005–2009
Electoral Bloc Democratic Moldova MPs